Neot HaKikar is a moshav in the northern Arava valley in Israel established in 1970.

Neot HaKikar was the site of the Neot HaKikar disaster, one of Israel's worst natural disasters.

References

Moshavim
Populated places in Southern District (Israel)
Populated places established in 1970
1970 establishments in Israel
Agricultural Union